Börde Wanzleben was a Verwaltungsgemeinschaft ("collective municipality") in the district of Börde (district), in Saxony-Anhalt, Germany. The seat of the Verwaltungsgemeinschaft was in Wanzleben. It was created in 2004 and disbanded on 1 January 2010.

The Verwaltungsgemeinschaft Börde Wanzleben consisted of the following municipalities (population in 2006 between brackets):

 Bottmersdorf (728)
 Domersleben (1,143)
 Dreileben (597)
 Eggenstedt (282)
 Groß Rodensleben (1,097)
 Hohendodeleben (1,813)
 Klein Rodensleben (577)
 Klein Wanzleben (2,470)
 Seehausen (1,892)
 Wanzleben (5,294)

References

Former Verwaltungsgemeinschaften in Saxony-Anhalt